Henry Kwong is a Hong Kong racing driver previously competing in the World Touring Car Championship driver, where he made his debut in 2014.

Racing career
Kwong began his career in 2012 in the Malaysia Merdeka Endurance Race. In 2014 Kwong made his World Touring Car Championship debut with Campos Racing driving a SEAT León WTCC in the last two rounds of the championship.

Racing record

Complete World Touring Car Championship results
(key) (Races in bold indicate pole position – 1 point awarded just in first race; races in italics indicate fastest lap – 1 point awarded all races; * signifies that driver led race for at least one lap – 1 point given all races)

References

External links
 

Living people
World Touring Car Championship drivers
Hong Kong racing drivers
Year of birth missing (living people)
Campos Racing drivers
Engstler Motorsport drivers